Arthur Barnard Trollope (31 July 1836 – 22 April 1872) was an English cricketer.

Trollope was educated at Marlborough, Tonbridge and St John's College, Cambridge. He made his first-class debut for Cambridge University against the Cambridge Town and Country Club in 1856. Trollope made one further appearance for the university against the Cambridge Town Club in 1857. While playing for the university, he was severely injured by a catapult, an early bowling machine, and was unable to play in the Varsity match.

In 1861, he represented Hampshire in a single first-class match against the Marylebone Cricket Club. In 1863, he played a single non-first-class match for the newly formed Hampshire County Cricket Club against Surrey.

Trollope died at Cowlam, Yorkshire on 22 April 1872.

Family
Trollope's nephews, Cecil Burton and Claude Burton both played first-class cricket.

References

External links
Arthur Trollope at Cricinfo
Arthur Trollope at CricketArchive

1836 births
1872 deaths
People from Totton and Eling
Alumni of St John's College, Cambridge
English cricketers
Cambridge University cricketers
Hampshire cricketers